Mike Landers is an American football coach. He served as the head football coach at Mount Ida College from 2008 to 2017. He played as a walk-on athlete at Georgia Tech.

The college closed after spring commencement in 2018; the University of Massachusetts Amherst acquired the campus and renamed it the Mount Ida Campus of UMass Amherst.

Head coaching record

References

Year of birth missing (living people)
Living people
American football defensive backs
Bridgewater State Bears football  coaches
Georgia Tech Yellow Jackets football players
Mount Ida Mustangs football coaches
Nichols Bison football coaches
Wesleyan Cardinals football  coaches